Apurva Nemlekar (born 27 December 1988) is a Marathi actress. She made her television debut with Aabhas Ha serial on Zee Marathi. She is known for her performance in Ratris Khel Chale 2 as Shevanta. Currently, she has participated in Bigg Boss Marathi 4 as a contestant where she emerged as 1st Runner-up.

Early life 
Apurva Nemlekar was born on 27 December 1988 and brought up in Mumbai, Maharashtra. She completed her BMS Degree from D. G. Ruparel College of Arts, Science and Commerce. After completing her studies, she started a job at an event management company.

Career
In 2011, She made her debut with Aabhas Ha Marathi series as Aarya. In 2014, She made her film debut with Bhakarkhadi 7 km. She acted in movies like Ishq Wala Love, The Accidental Prime Minister and Mixer. She also played a lead role in Aradhana. In 2015, She did a supporting role in Tu Jivala Guntavave as Soumya.

In 2019, She acted in Ratris Khel Chale 2 as Shevanta. She was played a role of Pummmy in Tuza Maza Jamtay from November 2020 to February 2021. From March 2021 to October 2021, she reprised her role as Shevanta in Ratris Khel Chale 3 before quitting the series due to dispute with producers and the channel. Since 2022, she is playing the role of Chinnamma in Sony Marathi's historical show Swarajya Saudamini Tararani and also paid a guest visit in Maharashtrachi Hasyajatra.

Since October 2022, she participated in Colors Marathi's reality show Bigg Boss Marathi 4.

Filmography

Films

Television

Theatre

References

External links 

 Apurva Nemlekar on IMDb
 Apurva Nemlekar on Instagram
 Apurva Nemlekar on CelebCouch

1988 births
Living people
Indian film actresses
21st-century Indian actresses
Indian television actresses
Marathi actors
Actresses in Marathi cinema
Actresses in Hindi cinema
Actresses in Marathi television
Bigg Boss Marathi contestants